The legislative branch of government in Jammu and Kashmir consists of:

 the Jammu and Kashmir Legislative Assembly, and
 the Lieutenant Governor of Jammu and Kashmir

Changes as a result of the Jammu and Kashmir Reorganisation Act

Until October 2019, the legislature of Jammu and Kashmir was bicameral consisting of an upper house, the Jammu and Kashmir Legislative Council and a lower house, the Jammu and Kashmir Legislative Assembly. In August 2019, a Reorganisation Act was passed by the Indian Parliament. The act will reorganise the current state of Jammu and Kashmir into two union territories; Jammu and Kashmir and Ladakh with effect from October 31, 2019. The new union territory of Jammu and Kashmir will elect a unicameral Legislative Assembly. The Legislative Council of Jammu and Kashmir was formally abolished on 16 October 2019.

References

 
Bicameral legislatures
Legislature
State legislatures of India